The Carnival of Madness is an annual hard rock/alternative rock tour founded in 2010. The festival has a Carnival theme and a family friendly atmosphere. Artist and band signings, give away's, circus performers, fire breathers, and more are also part of the show's activities.

Lineups

2010 lineup
 Shinedown
 Chevelle
 Puddle of Mudd
 Sevendust
 10 Years

2011 lineup
 Theory of a Deadman
 Alter Bridge
 Black Stone Cherry
 Adelitas Way
 Emphatic

2012 lineup
 Evanescence
 Chevelle
 Halestorm
 Cavo
 New Medicine

2013 lineup
 Shinedown
 Papa Roach
 Skillet
 In This Moment
 We As Human

2015 lineup
 Halestorm
 The Pretty Reckless
 Starset

UK Tour 2016 lineup
 Black Stone Cherry
 Shinedown
 Halestorm
 Highly Suspect

US Tour 2016 lineup
 Shinedown
 Halestorm
 Black Stone Cherry
 Whiskey Myers

2010 tour dates

References

External links

Rock festivals in the United States